Essential Montreux is a special edition, five CD box-set, by Northern Irish, blues rock guitarist and singer, Gary Moore. The box-set features five out of the six performances Gary Moore made at the Montreux Jazz Festival. His live performances at Montreux that feature in this box-set are Live at Montreux 1990, 1995, 1997, 1999 and 2001.

There are in total, sixty songs between the 5 cds with an approximate total playing time of six hours.

Track listing

Recorded at the Montreux Jazz Festival, 7 July 1990

Recorded at the Montreux Jazz Festival, 16 July 1995

Recorded at the Montreux Jazz Festival, 9 July 1997

Recorded at the Montreux Jazz Festival, 7 July 1999

Recorded at the Montreux Jazz Festival, 6 July 2001

Personnel 
Live at Montreux 1990
 Gary Moore - Lead vocals, lead and rhythm guitar
 Don Airey - Keyboards
 Andy Pyle - Bass guitar
 Graham Walker - Drums
 Frank Mead - Alto saxophone, harmonica
 Nick Pentelow - Tenor saxophone
 Nick Payn - Baritone saxophone
 Martin Drover - Trumpet
 Albert Collins (Special guest) Tracks 6, 7, 8, 9 & 11

Live at Montreux 1995
 Gary Moore - Lead vocals, lead and rhythm guitar
 Tommy Eyre - Keyboards
 Nick Payn - Baritone saxophone
 Nick Pentelow - Tenor saxophone
 Andy Pyle - Bass guitar
 Graham Walker - Drums

Live at Montreux 1997
 Gary Moore - Lead vocals, lead and rhythm guitar
 Magnus Fiennes - Keyboards
 Guy Pratt - Bass guitar, backing vocals
 Gary Husband - Drums

Live at Montreux 1999
 Gary Moore - Lead vocals, lead and rhythm guitar
 Vic Martin - Keyboards
 Pete Rees - Bass guitar
 Gary Husband - Drums

Live at Montreux 2001
 Gary Moore - Lead vocals, lead and rhythm guitar
 Vic Martin - Keyboards
 Pete Rees - Bass guitar
 Darrin Mooney - Drums

References 

Gary Moore live albums
2009 live albums